A CommonSense Revolution is a book written by Ben Murray-Bruce,
a Nigerian businessman and politician.

Background
Reviewed by Michael Moszynski, A CommonSense Revolution was published and presented on February 19, 2016 at Eko Hotels and Suites.

Criticism
Upon its release, the book was met with different reactions among critics. Igboeli Arinze of Leadership Newspaper criticized the motive of the book stating that "the trouble with Bruce’s Common Sense Revolution is that one cannot discern whether it is a publicity drive or a genuine cause to salvage Nigeria".

References

2016 non-fiction books
English-language books
Books about Nigeria